The mayor of Timaru is the directly elected head of the Timaru District Council, the local government authority for the Timaru District in New Zealand, which it controls as a territorial authority.

List of officeholders
There have been 40 mayors since the formation of the Timaru Borough Council in 1868. The current mayor is Nigel Bowen, who was first elected in the 2019 local elections.

Notes

References

 
Timaru